Raghurajpur is a heritage crafts village out of Puri district, India, known for its master Pattachitra painters, an art form which dates back to 5 BC in the region and Gotipua dance troupes, the precursor to the Indian classical dance form of Odissi. It is also known as the birthplace of one of the finest and Legendary Odissi exponents Padma Vibhushan Guru, Kelucharan Mohapatra and Gotipua Dancer Padma Shri Guru, Maguni Charan Das. It is also the birth place of Shilp Guru  
Dr. Jagannath Mahapatra who is a prominent Pattachitra Artist and has a huge contribution on the development of Pattachitra art and Raghurajpur village. Apart from that, the village is also home to crafts like Tussar paintings, Palm leaf Engravings, Stone carvings, Wood carvings, Cowdung toys and Papier mache toys, and masks.

In 2000, after a two-year research and documentation project by INTACH, starting 1998, the village was chosen to be developed as state's first heritage village and developed as a Crafts village, soon the village had an interpretation centre, commissioned artwork on the walls of the artists’ homes and a rest house.

It also has the distinction of the only place where the traditional decoration called Patas, used under the throne of Lord Jagannath and on the three chariots during the annual Rath Yatra festival, that takes place at pilgrimage town of Puri, some 14 km away, known for the Jagannath Temple.

Government and other stakeholders should use online campaigns to promote Pattachitra art of Raghurajpur village.

Overview

Situated amidst groves of coconut, palm, mango and jack fruit, the main village has two streets with over 120 houses, most decorated with mural paintings, where the painters reside and practice their pattachitra craft, besides many other that practices throughout the village, including traditional masks, stone idols, papier mache, sculptures, wooden toys. The village also has a series of temples dedicated not only to Bhuasuni, the local deity but also to various Hindu gods including, Radha Mohan, Gopinath, Raghunath, Laxminarayan and Gouranga.

Around, 2000 it was developed as a heritage village by INTACH, and soon became a major rural tourist destination of the state, drawing tourist, both domestic and foreign to the village. Villagers were also trained to provide heritage walks to the visitors by the organisation, and has since become a template for heritage tourism in the region.

Today it is also the venue of the annual Basant Utsav – Parampara Raghurajpur (Spring Festival), which was first organised in 1993 under the aegis of State Tourism Department and Eastern Zonal Cultural Centre, Kolkata, held in the month of February/March and an important tourist draw.

Pattachitra

The pattachitra paintings are made over a piece of cloth known as Patta or a dried palm leaf, which is first painted with a mixture of chalk and gum. Over the prepared surface, colourful and intricate pictures of various Gods, Goddesses, and mythological scenes with ornamentation of flowers, trees and animals are then painted. The paintings on Tussar saris, especially the Sambalpuri Saree depicting Mathura Vijay, Raslila and Ayodhya Vijay owe their origin to ‘Raghurajpur Pattachitra paintings’.

Location
It is situated 14 km away from Hindu pilgrimage town of Puri, on the southern banks of river Bhargabi (Bhargavi). Visitors from Puri take the Bhubaneswar road, near Chandanpur, on NH-316, and upon reaching the Chandanpur Bazaar, they can take a right turn to reach Raghurajpur. The village is then around 1.5 km from Chandanpur.

Notes

References

External links
 Raghurajpur Crafts village Orissa Review, Government of Orissa, November 2004.
 Raghurajpur Crafts village Rural tourism, Govt. of India
 Myths on a cloth at Mint

Villages in Puri district
Odia culture
Tourist attractions in Puri district
Indian painting
Articles containing video clips